Rincão (also: Porto Rincão) is a settlement in the western part of the island of Santiago, Cape Verde. In 2010 its population was 1,048. It is situated on the west coast, 6 km southwest of Assomada. The westernmost point of the island, Ponta da Janela, lies 2 km to the northwest.

References

Villages and settlements in Santiago, Cape Verde
Santa Catarina, Cape Verde
Populated coastal places in Cape Verde
Ports and harbours of Cape Verde